Frederic John Sewell (29 September 1913 – 18 November 2000) was an English cricketer. He played four first-class matches for Gloucestershire in 1937.

References

External links

1913 births
2000 deaths
English cricketers
Gloucestershire cricketers
People from Cotswold District
Sportspeople from Gloucestershire